Gyula Kadar may refer to:

People

Gyula Kádár (born 1898–1982), Hungarian military officer and writer
János Kádár (b. 1912–1989) Hungarian communist party and government leader

Fictional characters

Count Gyula Kadar, Trinity Blood character